Ethan Menahem Shevach (born 1943) is an immunologist at the National Institute of Allergy and Infectious Diseases (NIAID) in Bethesda, Maryland.

Biography
Shevach obtained his M.D. from Boston University Medical School in 1967. After clinical training, he joined NIAID as a senior staff fellow in 1972 becoming head of a research group the following year and a departmental head (section chief) in 1987. As of 2018, he is head of the Department of Cellular Immunology at NIAID.

Shevach served as editor-in-chief of the Journal of Immunology from 1987 to 1992 and edited Cellular Immunology from 1996 to 2007.

Research
Shevach made significant contributions towards understanding the function of regulatory T cells (TReg cells) in mediating the immune response. He discovered a subset of CD4+ T cells that express the transcription factor FOXP3 and operate by a mechanism that is distinct from the cytokine cascade. Known as TReg cells, their primary function is immunosuppressive. These TReg cells are targets for therapies against autoimmune diseases, cancer, and transplanted tissue rejection.

Awards
He has been a member of the American Association of Immunologists since 1973 and received its Distinguished Service Award in 1992.

In 2004, together with Shimon Sakaguchi, he won the Cancer Research Institute's William B. Coley Award for Distinguished Research in Basic and Tumor Immunology for  his part in elucidating the function of regulatory T cells in the control of autoimmune diseases.

Since 2015, Thomson Reuters (now Clarivate) has listed Shevach as among those most likely to win a Nobel Prize, based on his citation record.

References

1943 births
Living people
20th-century American physicians
20th-century American biologists
21st-century American scientists
21st-century American physicians
21st-century biologists
American immunologists